Lucius Junius Gallio Annaeanus or Gallio (Galliōn; c. 5 BC – c. AD 65) was a Roman senator and brother of the famous writer Seneca. He is best known for dismissing an accusation brought against Paul the Apostle in Corinth.

Life
Gallio (originally named Lucius Annaeus Novatus), the son of the rhetorician Seneca the Elder and the elder brother of Seneca the Younger, was born in Corduba (Cordova) c. 5 BC. He was adopted by Lucius Junius Gallio, a rhetorician of some repute, from whom he took the name of Junius Gallio. His brother Seneca, who dedicated to him the treatises De Ira and De Vita Beata, speaks of the charm of his disposition, also alluded to by the poet Statius (Silvae, ii.7, 32). It is probable that he was banished to Corsica with his brother, and that they returned together to Rome when Agrippina selected Seneca to be tutor to Nero. Towards the close of the reign of Claudius, Gallio was proconsul of the newly constituted senatorial province of Achaea, but seems to have been compelled by ill-health to resign the post within a few years. He was referred to by Claudius as "my friend and proconsul" in the Delphi Inscription, around 52.

Gallio was a suffect or replacement consul in the mid-50s, and Cassius Dio records that he introduced Nero's performances. Not long after the death of his brother, Seneca, Gallio (according to Tacitus, Ann. 15.73) was attacked in the Senate by Salienus Clemens, who accused him of being a "parricide and public enemy", though the Senate unanimously appealed to Salienus not to profit "from public misfortunes to satisfy a private animosity". He did not survive this reprieve long. When his second brother, Annaeus Mela, opened his veins after being accused of involvement in a conspiracy (Tacitus, Ann. 16.17), Gallio seems to have committed suicide, perhaps under instruction in 65 AD.

Gallio and Paul the Apostle
According to the Acts of the Apostles, when Gallio was proconsul of Achaea, Paul the Apostle was brought in front of him by Sosthenes, head of the local synagogue, with the accusation of having violated Mosaic Law. Gallio, however, was indifferent towards religious disputes between the Jews and Jewish Christians; therefore, he dismissed the charges against Paul (denegatio actionis) and had both him and the Jews removed from the Court (Acts 18:12-17).

Gallio's tenure can be fairly accurately dated to between AD 51–52. Therefore, the events of Acts 18 can be dated to this period. This is significant because it is the most accurately known date in the life of Paul.

See also
 Junia (gens)
List of biblical figures identified in extra-biblical sources
 Delphi Inscription

References

Resources
 Ancient sources: Tacitus, Annals, xv.73; Dio Cassius, lx.35, lxii.25.
 Bruce Winter, "Rehabilitating Gallio and his Judgement in Acts 18:14-15", Tyndale Bulletin 57.2 (2006) 291–308.
 Sir W. M. Ramsay, St Paul the Traveller, pp. 257–261
 
 An interesting reconstruction is given by Anatole France in Sur la pierre blanche.
 F. L. Lucas's story “The Hydra (A.D. 53)” in The Woman Clothed with the Sun, and other stories (Cassell, London, 1937; Simon & Schuster, N.Y., 1938) focuses on Gallio at the time of Paul's trial. "A Greek trader, a chance acquaintance of Judas Iscariot, comes to tell the Roman Governor of Corinth 'the real truth about this religious quarrel among the Jews', but is dissuaded by the tolerant old man from taking risks for Truth" (Time and Tide, August 14, 1937).
 Rudyard Kipling's Gallio's Song

External links
 Gallio at Bible Study
 Paul's Trial Before Gallio A summary of the historical evidence.
 The Gallio Inscription Greek text and English translation.

 
 

5 BC births
65 deaths
1st-century Romans
Ancient Roman adoptees
Ancient Romans who committed suicide
Annaei
Gallio, Annaeus, Lucius
People in Acts of the Apostles
Roman governors of Achaia
Romans from Hispania
Suffect consuls of Imperial Rome